This is a list of chairmen of the Supreme Council of Crimea:

Notes

References

External links
Official website 
World Statesmen.org

Supreme Council, chairmen
Crimea, Supreme Council